Bhakli is a village in the Kosli sub-division of Rewari district of Haryana in India. It is situated 80 kilometers from Delhi.

Adjacent villages
 Juddi
 Dhania
 naya gaon
 kosli
 chavva
 Amboli
 Salawas 
 Nathera

References

Cities and towns in Rewari district